Philippe DeRouville (born August 7, 1974) is a Canadian former professional ice hockey goaltender.

Playing career
DeRouville was a top prospect in junior hockey but his NHL tenure lasted all of three games in the 1990s. He bounced around the minors for five years before playing in various European leagues.

Born in Victoriaville, Quebec, DeRouville played in the QAAA with Magog before joining Longueuil Collège Français of the QMJHL. He was chosen 115th overall by the Pittsburgh Penguins in 1992 then returned to junior for two more years. DeRouville represented Canada at the 1993 World Junior Ice Hockey Championships. The gifted youngster was named to the league's second all-star team in 1993 and 1994. In 1993–94 his 3.06 goals against average was the best in the QMJHL.

DeRouville played most of his first two pro seasons with the IHL's Cleveland Lumberjacks but was recalled to make the odd appearance between the pipes for the Pens. In 1996–97, the emergence of rookie Patrick Lalime kept him from moving up to Pittsburgh. Eventually young goalie Jean-Sébastien Aubin and Peter Skudra supplanted DeRouville on the club's depth chart. Over his last two years he played in the ECHL, IHL, AHL and CHL before moving to Europe.  He played in Britain for the Ayr Scottish Eagles, Sweden for Timrå IK, France for Briançon and Italy for Brunico SG
.  He signed for the British Elite Ice Hockey League side Belfast Giants towards the end of the 2006–07 season replace injured goalie Mike Minard.  He re-signed for the Giants for the 2007–08 season but after the signing of Stevie Lyle from the Basingstoke Bison, it was announced on October 17, 2007 that DeRouville was released by the Giants.

DeRouville has received offers from 2 different teams on October 18, 2007 and signed on October 23, 2007 with the Croatian team KHL Medveščak from Zagreb, that plays in the Croatian and in the Slovenian league.

Career statistics

Awards
 QMJHL Defensive Rookie of the Year (1992)
 QMJHL Second All-Star Team (1993, 1994)

References

External links
 

1974 births
Living people
Ayr Scottish Eagles players
Belfast Giants players
Canadian expatriate sportspeople in Croatia
Canadian expatriate sportspeople in Germany
Canadian expatriate sportspeople in Italy
Canadian ice hockey goaltenders
Cleveland Lumberjacks players
Diables Rouges de Briançon players
Fredericton Canadiens players
French Quebecers
Hartford Wolf Pack players
Ice hockey people from Quebec
Kansas City Blades players
Longueuil Collège Français (QMJHL) players
Louisville RiverFrogs players
People from Victoriaville
Pittsburgh Penguins draft picks
Pittsburgh Penguins players
Quebec Amateur Athletic Association players
San Antonio Iguanas players
Timrå IK players
Utah Grizzlies (IHL) players
Verdun Collège Français players
Canadian expatriate ice hockey players in Scotland
Canadian expatriate ice hockey players in Northern Ireland
Canadian expatriate ice hockey players in France
Canadian expatriate ice hockey players in Sweden
Canadian expatriate ice hockey players in the United States